The Kitchen is an American cooking-themed talk show that airs on Food Network. The series is presented by Food Network chefs Sunny Anderson (Cooking for Real) and Jeff Mauro (Sandwich King) as well as chef Katie Lee, Iron Chef Geoffrey Zakarian and Iron Chef Alex Guarnaschelli. The show has produced over 430 episodes and 14 specials.

The series is currently in its twenty-seventh season, which began airing on January 2, 2021. Marcela Valladolid announced her departure from the show on October 18, 2017, citing a desire to focus on family.

Awards and nominations

References

External links

2010s American cooking television series
2014 American television series debuts
American television talk shows
English-language television shows
Food Network original programming
Food reality television series